Penicillium aureocephalum is a fungus species of the genus of Penicillium which was isolated in Catalonia in Spain on leaves from Quercus suber and Cistus salviifolius.

See also
 List of Penicillium species

References

Further reading
 Penicillium aureocephalum anam. sp. nov.

aureocephalum
Fungi described in 2001